Periga is a genus of moths in the family Saturniidae first described by Francis Walker in 1855.

Species
The genus includes the following species:

 Periga angulosa (Lemaire, 1972)
 Periga anitae Naumann, Brosch & Wenczel, 2005
 Periga armata (Lemaire, 1973)
 Periga aurantiaca (Lemaire, 1972)
 Periga bispinosa (Lemaire, 1972)
 Periga boettgerorum Naumann, Brosch & Wenczel, 2005
 Periga brechlini Naumann, Brosch & Wenczel, 2005
 Periga circumstans Walker, 1855
 Periga cluacina (Druce, 1886)
 Periga cynira (Cramer, 1777)
 Periga elsa (Lemaire, 1973)
 Periga extensiva Lemaire, 2002
 Periga falcata Walker, 1855
 Periga galbimaculata (Lemaire, 1972)
 Periga gueneei (Lemaire, 1973)
 Periga herbini Lemaire, 2002
 Periga inexpectata (Lemaire, 1972)
 Periga insidiosa (Lemaire, 1972)
 Periga intensiva (Lemaire, 1973)
 Periga kindli Lemaire, 1993
 Periga kishidai Naumann, Brosch & Wenczel, 2005
 Periga lichyi (Lemaire, 1972)
 Periga lobulata Lemaire, 2002
 Periga occidentalis (Lemaire, 1972)
 Periga parvibulbacea (Lemaire, 1972)
 Periga prattorum (Lemaire, 1972)
 Periga rasplusi (Lemaire, 1985)
 Periga sanguinea Lemaire, 2002
 Periga spatulata (Lemaire, 1973)
 Periga squamosa (Lemaire, 1972)

References

Hemileucinae